H2biz is a private conglomerate in Italy, with operates in the media sector, logistics, publishing, fashion, industry and services. It was created by Luigi De Falco.

The company is headquartered in Naples, with offices in Paris, New York City, Tangeri, Budva.

Company information 

H2biz was founded in November 2008 as a social business network. In 2010 H2biz turns into a hub to manage international transactions of its members.

In 2011 born FashionBiz, the brand dedicated to fashion.

In December 2011 H2biz founded Outsider News, a newspaper based in Geneva.

Between 2012 and 2013 H2biz launches MED and EurAmerica, two networks operating in the Mediterranean, BRICS and South America.

In 2013 H2biz signs a business joint venture with Cyprus.

In 2014 H2biz diversified in the fields of logistics and commodity trading, buying silos in the Mediterranean.

In early 2015, H2biz began the construction of a port in Montenegro.

References

External links
H2biz Group Official Website
Outsider News

Mass media companies of Italy
Companies based in Naples
Conglomerate companies established in 2008
Conglomerate companies of Italy
Professional networks